"Shine On" is a song by British rock band Humble Pie from their 1971 album Rock On. It was written by Peter Frampton. The B-side of the single is "Mister Ring", written by Greg Ridley.

Rock On was the last studio album to feature Frampton. He would later perform the song in his concerts, to be featured on his album Frampton Comes Alive!

Personnel

Humble Pie 
Peter Frampton - vocals, guitar
Steve Marriott - organ
Greg Ridley - bass
Jerry Shirley - drums

Soul Sisters 
 P. P. Arnold, Doris Troy, Claudia Lennear - backing vocals

External links
Humble Pie.net

1971 singles
Humble Pie (band) songs
Songs written by Peter Frampton
Song recordings produced by Glyn Johns
Peter Frampton songs
Song recordings produced by Peter Frampton
1971 songs
A&M Records singles